Days of Tomorrow (天長地久) is a 1993 Hong Kong romantic drama film written and directed by Jeffrey Lau, produced by and starring Andy Lau.

Summary
Days of Tomorrow tells the story of a young girl, Yan (Hilary Tsui), who has been brought up never knowing much about her father. Her mother won't tell her and all she knows is that he was an actor in an old movie. When the movie is set to be remade, she applies for a job and it is there she runs into a woman who doesn't want the movie remade who knows her father. The woman tells her the story of the actor Fong Tak-shing (Andy Lau).

Cast
 Andy Lau as Fong Tak-shing
 Jay Lau as Ling / Lily
 Carrie Ng as Nancy
 Deanie Ip as Ling's mother (guest star)
 Hilary Tsui as Yan
 Yip san as Sheung
 Lau Kong as Lam
 Henry Fong as Mr. Lui
 Danny Poon as Ban
 Kenneth Chan as Movie star
 Power Chan as Pong
 Lee Siu-kei as Keung
 Lam Seung-mo as Sheung's lover
 Daniel Yu as Movie director
 Eric Kong as Cheong
 Hon San
 Kwok Tak-sun as Uncle Six
 So Wai-nam
 Lam Kwok-kit
 Jameson Lam

See also
Andy Lau filmography

References

External links 
 

1993 films
1993 romantic drama films
Hong Kong romantic drama films
1990s Cantonese-language films
Films produced by Andy Lau
Films directed by Jeffrey Lau
Films about actors
Films set in Hong Kong
Films shot in Hong Kong
1990s Hong Kong films